Kappa Alpha Order, commonly known as Kappa Alpha or simply KA, is a social fraternity and a fraternal order founded in 1865 at Washington and Lee University in Lexington, Virginia. As of December 2015, the Kappa Alpha Order lists 133 active chapters, five provisional chapters, and 52 suspended chapters. Along with Alpha Tau Omega and Sigma Nu, the order constitutes the Lexington Triad. Since its establishment in 1865, the Order has initiated more than 150,000 members.

History
Kappa Alpha Order was founded as Phi Kappa Chi on December 21, 1865, at Washington College, now Washington and Lee University, in Lexington, Virginia.  James Ward Wood, William Archibald Walsh, and brothers William Nelson Scott and Stanhope McClelland Scott are the founders of the fraternity. Soon after the founding, the local Virginia Beta chapter of Phi Kappa Psi protested the name "Phi Kappa Chi", due to the similarity of the names, leading Wood to change the name of the fraternity to K.A. by April 1866. Within one year, the order's ritual would be expanded upon by Samuel Zenas Ammen, who was dubbed the "practical founder". In the years that followed, the fraternity spread throughout the Southern United States, as well as other states such as California, Arizona and New Mexico.

KA is one-third of the Lexington Triad, along with Alpha Tau Omega and Sigma Nu. The founders listed Robert E. Lee's chivalry and gentlemanly conduct as an inspiration. At the 1923 Convention, Lee was designated as the "Spiritual Founder" of the Order by John Temple Graves.

Association with Robert E. Lee 
The founding members of Kappa Alpha Order enrolled at Washington College (now Washington and Lee University) in the spring semester of 1866. Robert E. Lee was the president of the college from the summer of 1865 until his death in 1870. James Ward Wood, one of the founders of the Order, fought with Lee and the Confederacy in Company F of the 7th Virginia Cavalry. Material published by the organization describes Lee as "a true gentleman, the last gentle knight."

Lee became the spiritual founder (i.e. moral role model) in 1923 and part of the KA Mission Statement in 1994. Prior to this, the fraternity maintained no formal ties to Lee, but fraternity manuscripts mentioned Southern culture and Lee's influence on the fraternity in a number of ways. For example, the History and Catalogue of the Kappa Alpha Fraternity (published by Chi Chapter at Vanderbilt University in 1891 with permission by the Fifteenth Kappa Alpha Convention) describes the organization's founding:

"Conceived and matured at a college of which Gen. R. E. Lee was president, at the close of a fateful military conflict; in the Valley of Virginia made dear to Southern hearts by its vigor in battling for Southern rights...plundered and wrecked by the infamous Hunter's invading force; among the people with whom Stonewall Jackson lived till duty called him to arms... with this environment it was but natural that the Order should be of a semi-military type and have for its aim the cultivation and graces conceived to be distinctively Southern."

According to some early twentieth century KA's, Lee directly helped KA expand its chapters, allowing members to “leave their academic duties . . . to install chapters in other colleges.” In one KA's words, Lee promoted KA's "extension work," while the KA Journal reprinted other who believed Lee helped KA expand. In the 1915 review of The Birth of a Nation that appeared in the KA Journal, the KA reviewers wrote that Lee's personality helped to give the Ku Klux Klan's and KA's shared ideals a "stamp and character which have since connected the name of Kappa Alpha with all that is best of Southern chivalry.”

KA endorsed a version of the Lost Cause narrative in its early historical documents. The fraternity's history from 1891 paints the battle in Virginia as one of valor in defense of states' rights rather than in defense of slavery. It also depicts Union forces as invaders. The fraternity history reads "Southern in its loves, it took Jackson and Lee as its favorite types of the perfect Knight. Caucasian in its sympathies, it excluded the African from membership." Built into the early foundations of the organization is racially exclusionary language.

It is with this context that the organization named Robert E. Lee the spiritual founder in 1923. There are four justifications the fraternity provides for Lee's placement on a pedestal within the organization:

 Lee's coming to Washington College as president: He served as an emblem of honor and duty for his students.
 The 1915 Convention in Richmond Virginia: Here, the founding Scott brothers, along with Colonel Jo Lane Stern (a former aide to Lee in the Civil War), testified to Lee's influence in the genesis of the organization.
 Former Knight Commander John Temple Graves' 1923 Toast: At the 1923 convention in Washington D.C., Former Knight Commander John Temple Graves (KC in 1881) gave a toast, which formally solidified Lee as spiritual founder from that point into present day. Graves' toast is firmly rooted in the pro-Confederate Lost Cause of the Confederacy ideology to which KA subscribed. The toast nearly deified Lee, comparing him to Jesus Christ. The toast said born with Lee was the "KA Creed." Graves pronounced: The real toast to the real founder has never been written or spoken. Let us speak it here tonight  With unbroken regularity and with unfailing reverent tenderness the Kappa Alpha Fraternity yearly celebrated the Nineteenth Day of January.  Upon that day was born the noblest character that has lived in mortal flesh since the Babe was born in Bethlehem of old Judea.  Upon that day was born Robert Edward Lee of Virginia.  Upon that day was really born the Creed and matchless Ritual of the Kappa Alpha Order. For when Lee was born the Creed was born, or the inspiration for the Creed...  Robert E. Lee inspired and visualized in actual living the matchless Ritual of our Fraternity, and his name will live in our hearts and in human history forever. Ammen was the practical Founder...Lee was the spiritual Founder...But the spirit of Lee inspired the spirit of Ammen; the life of Lee had fired the heart of Ammen; the fingers of Lee had touched the fingers of Ammen who wrote the Creed.  Knights, Gentlemen, Brethren:  Lift your glasses here to-night, and in the liquid spotless as his fame let us pledge for all time the Spiritual Founder--the first, last, and incomparable Knight Commander of the Kappa Alpha Order--Robert Edward Lee of Virginia.The Toast appears in the 12th edition of the Varlet, but has been removed in the most recent thirteenth edition. It is also notable that Graves, a famed Southern orator and politician, was famous for championing lynching, white mob violence, and the codification of African American inferiority under the law on the national lecture circuit. Notably, KA supported Graves' career and The Kappa Alpha Journal called a speech in which Graves championed the lynching African Americans "a most powerful address on the subject of lynching and the race problem."
 The 1929 convention in Louisville, Kentucky: The general body at this convention changed the Convivium date (a celebration commemorating the organization's founding) to Robert E. Lee's birthday, January 19.

Lee has continued to inspire the members of Kappa Alpha Order since 1923 and remains the spiritual founder. In 1994, the advisory council of KA set the mission statement of the organization as such:Kappa Alpha Order seeks to create a lifetime experience which centers on reverence to God, duty, honor, character and gentlemanly conduct as inspired by Robert E. Lee, our spiritual founder.This, too, remains unchanged, despite ongoing internal and external controversy, over KA's association with Lee.

Administrative office
The Kappa Alpha Order National Administrative Office is located at Mulberry Hill, in Lexington, Virginia. It is documented that Mulberry Hill is where Robert E. Lee spent his first night in Lexington, after arriving to take over as president of Washington College. Mulberry Hill is a Virginia Historic Landmark, and was listed on the National Register of Historic Places in 1982. The offices for the Kappa Alpha Order Educational Foundation are also housed there.

Member programs

Number I's Leadership Institute
The Number I's Leadership Institute (Number 1 is the title of the chapter president) is an intensive informational and educational retreat for chapter presidents. The retreat is held at a Baptist conference center.

Kappa Alpha Order Educational Foundation (KAOEF)
Established in 1982, the Kappa Alpha Order Educational Foundation (KAOEF) is a 501(c)(3) charitable organization. The Foundation provides grants for educational programs of the fraternity, such as the National Leadership Institute and Province Councils, and provides scholarships to graduate and undergraduate students. KAOEF funds these programs with donations contributed by KA alumni.

Journal
The Kappa Alpha Journal (or KA Journal) is the fraternity's magazine. It has been published since 1879. Members of the Kappa Alpha Order are entitled to a free subscription to The KA Journal if initiated within the last ten years, or are a member of The Loyal Order. Members initiated between 1936 and 1951 are given a lifetime subscription to the publication.

Loyal Order
The Loyal Order is an alumni program for the Kappa Alpha Order. The national office uses the money from Loyal Order memberships to help defray the cost of distributing the KA Journal, as well as other alumni resources.

Military Division
The Military Division of Kappa Alpha Order was established in 2009. Membership is open to Kappa Alphas who are currently serving, honorably discharged, or retired from the United States Armed Forces. The Recognition Pin of the Military Order features the Maltese Cross, utilizing KA's colors crimson and old gold, and has 8 points in the cross, which symbolize the chivalric virtues of loyalty, piety, frankness, bravery, glory and honor, contempt of death, helpfulness towards the poor and sick, and respect for the church.

Symbolism
The colors of The Order are traditionally Crimson and Old Gold. The colors represent the blood sacrificed (crimson red) and the money spent (old gold) in defense of the country. The flowers of the Order are the crimson rose and the magnolia blossom. The crimson rose represents masculine might and the white magnolia blossom represents purity.

The flowers of the order and a ribbon featuring the order's motto adorn the bottom of the crest. The crest itself is representative of several things; the hand holding the axe represents the continuing power of the Knight Commander and of the order. The Helmet was, at one time, a symbol used by the Knight Commander of the Order. The badge is featured at the center of the crest, and the lions on either side represent different things each. The lion on the left, looking away, symbolizes "rampant", meaning magnanimous. The lion on the right, looking towards you, symbolizes "regardent", which means cautious or circumspect.

Motto
The Kappa Alpha Order motto is "Dieu et les Dames" (God and the Ladies) and is written on the ceiling of the Mississippi State Capitol.
Kappa Alpha Order also utilizes the motto tagline "A Moral Compass for the Modern Gentlemen."

Membership manual
Kappa Alpha Order's membership manual is called The Varlet. It includes KA's laws, history, structure, etc. Each member receives one in cardinal red and it is available to read online for non-members.

Chapters

Notable members

Accusations of racism
Kappa Alpha Order and Kuklos Adelphon having the same initials "KA" is a  coincidence, as originally Kappa Alpha Order went by the name Phi Kappa Chi, which would have given them the initials , as stated earlier.

According to the fraternity, "The popular old antebellum society, Kuklos Adelphon, founded at the University of North Carolina in 1812, had all but perished during the recent war, but its reputation was well known in the South. Kuklos Adelphon was more than a mere college fraternity. Its “Circles” met in communities long after its members left college campuses. Wood was aware of this and the concept of a lifelong “Circle of Brothers” had great appeal to him."

Historian Taulby Edmondson, who has studied KA's archives, has highlighted that KA's official journal often spoke in the early twentieth century about what it believed was KA's relationship to the Ku Klux Klan Upon the release of the film The Birth of a Nation in 1915, a major motion picture based on the novel The Clansman by KA alumnus Thomas Dixon, Jr., two KA brothers reviewed the film in The Kappa Alpha Journal and said that "The Kuklux Klan came and grew and served its purpose . . . [KA] came and grew and it embraced all the Southland . . . and still serves and cherishes those same ideals which the clan came forward to preserve. . . . The actions and the membership of the Klan are shrouded in mystery. . . . But its members wore upon their breast the circled cross of the Kappa Alpha Order." The review continued that "the Klan served, by militant, warlike means, those same ideals which our Order was organized to cherish.” Five years later, the KA Journal's editor proclaimed in a book he authored about KA's "Practical Founder," Samuel Zenas Ammen, that “The Ku Klux Klan was of contemporaneous origins and had an identity of purpose with Kappa Alpha."

Some KA groups referred to themselves as being members of a "Klan." Some members referred to themselves as being members of a "Klan." In 1917, some KA alumni wrote in The Kappa Alpha Journal that they had formed an "informal Klan" in Detroit, Michigan, and, in 1913, the KA chapter at the College of William and Mary called itself "the KA Klan living on the peninsula between the York and the James." Additionally, in 1920, the Beta Eta chapter of Oklahoma University bragged in the KA Journal about its Ku Klux Klan-themed dance, which it called "the talk of the University" and said "was the best [dance] ever given." The KA Journal wrote about the dance that "The girls were dressed in the days of 1865, and the members wore the white robe and hood of the Ku Klux, with a crimson cross on a golden background [KA's symbol], worn over the heart."

The 1957 edition of the University of Alabama's yearbook, The Corolla, also features an image of KAs parading in Confederate uniforms under the words "The Klan in their afternoon formals."
Edmondson, the historian, notes that there is a glaring historical legacy between KA's history of devotion to protecting white womanhood and a 2019 incident in which three members of its University of Mississippi chapter were suspended after they posted a photo on an Instagram account showing them posing with guns next to a bullet-riddled sign memorializing Emmett Till. Till, a 14-year-old African-American youth from Chicago, was brutally lynched in Mississippi in 1955 for allegedly offending Carolyn Bryant, a white woman. The local U.S. Attorney said that the incident regarding the Till memorial had been referred for further investigation to the Civil Rights Division of the Department of Justice. The students withdrew from the university, but they were not charged with a hate crime.     

The fraternity has also been criticized for identification with the Confederacy and other forms of racism. In November 2002, the Zeta Psi and Kappa Alpha Order chapters at the University of Virginia were suspended and subsequently cleared after the fraternities held a Halloween party where a few guests were photographed wearing blackface and dressed up as Uncle Sam and Venus and Serena Williams.

In 2009, Kappa Alpha Order at the University of Alabama was criticized for wearing Confederate uniforms for an "Old South" parade that passed by an African-American sorority house celebrating its 35th anniversary. The organization apologized for any offense that might have been caused. Kappa Alpha Order on other campuses, including Auburn, Centenary College, Mississippi State University, and the University of Georgia had already ceased to wear Confederate uniforms in public following complaints from students. The national organization banned the wearing of Confederate uniforms to its "Old South" parades in 2010, although video from 2012 showed the uniforms still being worn. Kappa Alpha order further outlawed the name, "Old South", from being used for social events in 2013.

In April 2016, the fraternity's Tulane University chapter in New Orleans, Louisiana, constructed a sand-bag wall around its house that contained spray-painted slogans in reference to Republican presidential candidate Donald Trump's proposal to build a wall between the U.S. and Mexico. The chapter said that the wall had been built for an annual "capture the flag" game and that the pro-Trump slogans were satirical and not in support of the candidate or his message. Some students protested that the wall was offensive and anti-immigrant or anti-Latino. The wall was later forcefully dismantled, allegedly in part by members of the Tulane football team.

Local chapter and individual member misconduct 
In 1980, several students at Vanderbilt University including Graham Matthews, an African-American graduate student in the divinity school, decided to hold Nat Turner Day to protest the fraternity's celebration of Old South Day, when KA brothers dressed as CSA personnel. The university administrators sided with KA, banned Nat Turner Day, and let KA parade in their Confederate costumes. Michael Patton, now a philosophy professor at the University of Montevallo, "put on a cap with antlers"; he was called a homophobic slur and beaten up by the KA chapter.

In 1997, a former pledge at Texas A&M University had to have a testicle surgically removed due to a fraternity member giving him a "super wedgie." This same year a pet goat was shot and killed with a gun in front of pledges at the fraternity's chapter house. One fraternity member was indicted for the incident.

In 2008, the fraternity chapter at Midwestern State University was suspended for three years after a pledge almost died due to alcohol poisoning under the fraternity's supervision.

In 2011, the chapter at Georgetown College was suspended by the national office of the fraternity after several members allegedly shouted racial slurs at a minority student on campus during an event in which members run through campus in their boxer shorts and shout in front of women's dormitories, though no one willing to testify to this incident proved willing to step forward in the subsequent days.  The national office also issued a public apology on behalf of the chapter. An African-American student who unsuccessfully demanded that the chapter take down a Confederate flag in the aftermath of the incident was suspended, however, for brandishing a toy gun.
In 2020, the chapter was suspended for a minimum of four years for "racial prejudice, gender discrimination, misogyny, and threatening behavior".

In 2011, an investigation was started after a fraternity member fired a shotgun inside the University of Texas at Austin's chapter house. Following claims by the fraternity that the chapter had hazed pledges, hired adult performers for multiple live sex shows, and broken other fraternity rules, the fraternity suspended the chapter for one year. The chapter refuted the hazing allegation as minor and unsupported by evidence, and broke-ties with the national organization, forming a new fraternity, Texas Omicron. Kappa Alpha Order then sued Texas Omicron, unsuccessfully, for dues and other monies, as well as furnishings from the chapter house.

In 2013, the fraternity at the University of Virginia was temporarily suspended due to several serious allegations of hazing and misconduct.

In 2015, Jonathan Ford, the son of Alabama State Representative Craig Ford and a former football recruit at Birmingham-Southern College, sued the fraternity for hazing and injuries he says he sustained while pledging which resulted in his football career ending prematurely.

In 2015, the fraternity chapter at Virginia Wesleyan College was suspended for at least four years by the national organization. An investigation by the school determined that hazing had occurred in violation of school policy, but that it was not criminal.

In 2015, the chapter at Emory University was suspended for three years due to violating anti-hazing policies.

In 2016, the chapter at the University of Richmond was suspended after a strongly sexist and offensive email sent by the fraternity was reported to the university.

In 2016, the chapter at the University of Missouri was placed on suspension and investigation after a freshman pledging was hospitalized due to a hazing incident that involved drinking excessive amounts of alcohol with the purported purpose of somehow validating his manhood.

In 2016, the fraternity chapter at the College of Charleston was closed after the chapter president and other members were arrested for being involved in a major off-campus drug ring.  The fraternity was also accused of drugging and raping several young women who attended their parties.

In 2017, the fraternity chapter at Southern Methodist University was suspended for four years (until 2021) and members living in the chapter house were forced to evacuate the premises for hazing pledges in the spring.  The hazing found, according to the university: "paddling; servitude required of new members; forcing new members to consume alcohol; forcing new members to participate in calisthenics; forcing new members to consume food items such as jalapeños, habaneros, red onions, and milk until vomiting was induced; forcing new members to wear clothing soiled with vomit; sleep deprivation; 'underground membership.'"

In 2020, the fraternity chapter at Furman University was suspended for four years following an incident involving an unapproved off-campus party during the height of the COVID-19 pandemic. Nearly 60% of attendees subsequently tested positive for COVID-19. The chapter had previously been subject to disciplinary probation for a misconduct incident in 2019.

In 2020, the fraternity chapter at the University of Tennessee was suspended for four years following a years-long string of hazing- and alcohol-related incidents.

In 2022, the fraternity chapter at the University of Virginia was suspended for four years following a hazing incident that included alcohol and cigarette binge consumption.

See also
 List of social fraternities and sororities

References

External links
 
 The Racist Frat That Tried To Shut Me Up

 
Student organizations established in 1865
Active former members of the North American Interfraternity Conference
Student societies in the United States
Lexington triad
1865 establishments in Virginia
Robert E. Lee